Piptostigma fugax is a species of plant in the Annonaceae family. It is found in Ivory Coast, Ghana, and Liberia. It is threatened by habitat loss.

References

Annonaceae
Vulnerable plants
Flora of Ivory Coast
Flora of Ghana
Flora of Liberia
Taxonomy articles created by Polbot